David Ghazaryan (5 May 1989 – September–October 2020) was an Armenian Lieutenant-Colonel, who participated and fell during the Second Nagorno-Karabakh war. In 2020, he was posthumously awarded the military award of Hero of Artsakh.

Awards and honours 
A decree by Arayik Harutyunyan, the President of the Republic of Artsakh, awarded David Ghazaryan posthumously the title of Hero of Artsakh.
"For exceptional services rendered to the Artsakh Republic while defending and ensuring the security of the Motherland, as well as for bravery and personal courage, I have awarded David Ghazaryan, servicemen of the Defense Army. with the highest title of the "Hero of Artsakh" (posthumously), awarding him with the "Golden Eagle" order.

— President of the Republic of Artsakh, Arayik Harutyunyan
According to the President, Ghazaryan fought by the principle of “not a step back” and performed a heroic deed.

Personal life 
Ghazaryan was married and had two children.

References 

1989 births
2020 deaths
Heroes of Artsakh
Armenian military personnel
Artsakh military personnel
2016 Nagorno-Karabakh clashes
Armenian military personnel of the 2020 Nagorno-Karabakh war
People killed in the 2020 Nagorno-Karabakh war
People from Vedi